Albert Charles "Joe" Procter (22 May 1906 – 11 October 1989) was a New Zealand rugby union player. A wing three-quarter, Procter represented Otago at a provincial level, and was a member of the New Zealand national side, the All Blacks, in 1932. He played four matches for the All Blacks including one international against .

References

1906 births
1989 deaths
Rugby union players from Dunedin
People educated at King Edward Technical College
New Zealand rugby union players
New Zealand international rugby union players
Otago rugby union players
Rugby union wings